Ambacourt is a commune in the Vosges department in Grand Est in northeastern France.

Geography
The river Madon flows through the commune.   The river here accommodates a small colony of beavers: this is believed to reflect the quality of the water.

See also
Communes of the Vosges department

References

Communes of Vosges (department)